Ulmus wallichiana subsp. wallichiana was identified by Melville and Heybroek 
after the latter's expedition to the Himalaya in 1960.

Description
A deciduous tree growing to 30 m with a crown comprising several ascending branches. The bark of the trunk is grey-brown, furrowed longitudinally. The leaves range from 6–13 cm long by 2.5–6 cm broad, elliptic-acuminate in shape, and with a glabrous upper surface, on petioles 5–10 mm long. The samarae are orbicular to obovate, 10–13 mm in diameter, on 5 mm pedicels, the seed central.

Pests and diseases
The tree has a high resistance to the fungus Ophiostoma himal-ulmi endemic to the Himalayas and the cause of Dutch elm disease there.

Cultivation
The tree is not known to be in cultivation beyond the Himalaya.

References
Melville, R. & Heybroek, H. (1971). Elms of the Himalaya. Kew Bulletin, Vol. 26 (1). Kew, London.

External links

wallichiana subsp. wallichiana
Elm species and varieties
Flora of West Himalaya
Trees of Pakistan
Vulnerable plants
Plant subspecies
Ulmus articles missing images